The 2nd Armored Brigade is a military formation of the Republic of Korea Army. The brigade is subordinated to the I Corps.

History 
It was founded along with the "1st Armored Brigade" on 1 April 1968, and from 4 October 1971, both brigades were assigned to the 1st Corps. At the time of its establishment, it was stationed in Yangju, Gyeonggi Province, but since 1973, it has been moved to current headquarters at Paju, Gyeonggi.

The 2nd Armored Brigade command post was used by the USFK 7th Division (Camp Ross). On 27 June 1973, US forces withdrew due to Nixon Doctrine and 2nd Armored Brigade took over the site.

Organization 

Headquarters:
Headquarters Company
Air Defense Artillery Battery
Armored Engineer Company
Chemical Company
Armored Reconnaissance Company
Signal Company
Support Company
Intelligence Company
6th Armored Battalion (K1A2)
16th Armored Battalion (K1A2)
29th Armored Battalion (K1A2)
106th Mechanized Infantry Battalion (K200A1)
121st Mechanized Infantry Battalion (K200A1)
606th Artillery Battalion (moved from 30th Mechanized Infantry Division after it was disbanded, K9)
933rd Artillery Battalion (K55A1)

References 

Military units and formations established in 1968
Paju